Kaʻōanaʻeha Mele or Mary Kuamoʻo Kaʻōanaʻeha (c.1780–1850) was a Hawaiian high chiefess during the formation of the Kingdom of Hawaii.

Parentage 
She was born circa 1780
the daughter of High Chiefess Kalikoʻokalani. Genealogists disagree over who was Kaoanaeha's father due to her mother's two marriages. Most say she was the daughter of High Chief Keliʻimaikaʻi (The Good Chief) who was the only full-blood brother of Kamehameha I, being the son of Keōua and Kekuʻiapoiwa II. Some  say her father was High Chief Kalaipaihala, son of Kalaniʻōpuʻu, King of Hawaii and uncle of Kamehameha. King Kalākaua and Queen Liliʻuokalani supports the later due to their conflict with Kaoanaeha's granddaughter Emma Naʻea who ran for Queen Regnant in the Royal Election of 1874. Keliʻimaikaʻi accepted her as daughter and most say he was her true father. She was the only person allowed to see him at his deathbed.

Fifty years after her death, a claim was brought by Robert William Wilcox that she was the daughter of Keaka, a low-ranking Tahitian chief, who came to the islands and married Kalikoʻokalani. This claim was brought up in an editorial to defame one of Kaʻōanaʻeha's descendants.

Royal status 
Because of her royal status, when she was born pūloʻuloʻu or kapu sticks with tapa-covered balls on the ends were set up before her house and pahu heiau or kapu drums were beaten heralding her birth. Further confirmation of her high status was when her father Keliimaikai died in 1810, she was reportedly the only person allowed to enter his premises.

One romantictised version of her meeting with English sailor John Young is similar to the story of Pocahontas and John Smith:
Young and Davis would have been killed had not Kaoanaeha, a high lady, fallen in love with Young and by her intercession with the King saved the lives of both sailors.  Kaoanaeha was the most beautiful woman on the island of Owhyhee (Hawaii) and was the admiration of all the sailors who visited Karakakooa Bay.  She was the only daughter of Keliimaiki, the favorite brother of the great King, Kamehameha I.  John Young and Kaoanaeha were soon married.  King Kamehameha appreciated the superior talents of the white men and made them high chiefs.

Death 
In the last days of her life, she wished to stay in Kawaihae.  She had been reluctant to go to Honolulu and probably knew that she would not return just as fifteen years before, her husband did not return.  At sixty-two and too ill to be cured, she died in Rooke House on January 22, 1850.  She was buried the next day on the palace grounds by the Royal Tomb, without any high ceremony.  Some wondered why a chiefess of her status would be buried so quietly.  The official Polynesian did not make much of her death either, devoting just a few lines to her obituary.  One reason for the lack of respect indicated that she was "out of favor in the royal circle of Honolulu" partly because she preferred the traditional Hawaiian values, including the ancient religion, and had resisted Christianity and Westernization.

Family tree

Notes

References 

Kanahele, George S.. Emma: Hawai'i's Remarkable Queen : a Biography . University of Hawaii Press, 1999.
Hawaiian Kingdom 1854–1874, Twenty Critical Years By Ralph S. Kuykendall

1780 births
1850 deaths
Young, Mrs
House of Keliimaikai
Burials at the Royal Mausoleum (Mauna ʻAla)